Baddeley Green is an area of Stoke-on-Trent, Staffordshire, England.

Baddeley Green is part of the Abbey Green ward, which covers the areas of Baddeley Green, Milton and Abbey Hulton as well as Baddeley Edge and Light Oaks.

Notes

External links

Areas of Stoke-on-Trent